In the field of physics concerning condensed matter, a Kohn anomaly (also called the Kohn effect) is an anomaly in the dispersion relation of a phonon branch in a metal. It is named for Walter Kohn. For a specific wavevector, the frequency (and thus the energy) of the associated phonon is considerably lowered, and there is a discontinuity in its derivative. They have been first proposed by Walter Kohn in 1959. In extreme cases (that can happen in low-dimensional materials), the energy of this phonon is zero, meaning that a static distortion of the lattice appears. This is one explanation for charge density waves in solids. The wavevectors at which a Kohn anomaly is possible are the nesting vectors of the Fermi surface, that is vectors that connect a lot of points of the Fermi surface (for a one-dimensional chain of atoms this vector would be ). The electron phonon interaction causes a rigid shift of the Fermi sphere and a failure of the Born-Oppenheimer approximation since the electrons do not follow any more the ionic motion adiabatically.

In the phononic spectrum of a metal, a Kohn anomaly is a discontinuity in the derivative of the dispersion relation that occurs at certain high symmetry points of the first Brillouin zone, produced by the abrupt change in the screening of lattice vibrations by conduction electrons. 
Kohn anomalies arise together with Friedel oscillations when one considers the Lindhard theory instead of the Thomas–Fermi approximation in order to find an expression for the dielectric function of a homogeneous electron gas.

Many different systems exhibit Kohn anomalies, including graphene, bulk metals, and many low-dimensional systems (the reason involves the condition , which depends on the topology of the Fermi surface). However, it is important to emphasize that only materials showing metallic behaviour can exhibit a Kohn anomaly, since the model emerges from a homogeneous electron gas approximation.

See also
Zero sound
Pomeranchuk instability

References

Condensed matter physics